Ariake Station (有明駅) is the name of two train stations in Japan:

 Ariake Station (Nagano)
 Ariake Station (Tokyo)